The Ottawa 67's are a major junior ice hockey team based in Ottawa, Ontario, Canada, that plays in the Ontario Hockey League (OHL). Established during Canada's centennial year of 1967 and named in honour of this, the 67's currently play their home games at TD Place Arena. The 67's are three-time OHL champions, and have played in the Memorial Cup five times, winning in 1984 and as host team in 1999.

History
The Ontario Hockey Association granted the city of Ottawa an expansion franchise on February 16, 1967. Four months later, the team was given the nickname 67's, in honour of Canada's centennial year. Three local businessmen—Bill Cowley, Howard Darwin and Bill Touhey as well as Alderman Howard Henry—helped bring junior hockey back to Canada's capital. The 67's filled the overall hockey void left by the departure of the junior Ottawa-Hull Canadiens in 1959 and the semi-professional  Hull-Ottawa Canadiens in 1963.

Bill Long was the team's first head coach. The 67's played their first game on October 6, 1967, losing 9–0 on the road to the Niagara Falls Flyers. The first 11 home games of the season were played in the Hull Arena, Hull, Quebec, as their new home arena was still under construction. The first season for the 67's was terrible at best, with the team posting a final record of six wins, 45 losses and three ties. They then made the playoffs in their second season, but lost in the quarter-finals to the Niagara Falls Flyers.

The 67's reached the OHA finals during their fifth season in 1971–72, losing to the Peterborough Petes 3–0, with two ties. The 67's came close to playing at home in the Memorial Cup, as the Ottawa Civic Centre hosted the tournament that year.

Brian Kilrea joins the 67's
After a rebuilding season in 1973–74, the 67's hired a young up-and-coming coach named Brian Kilrea, who has since become a legend in Ottawa. Kilrea coached the team to three successive improved winning records, culminating in a victory in the J. Ross Robertson Cup finals in 1977, versus the London Knights, who were coached by former 67's bench boss Bill Long. During the late 1970s, Ottawa was led by scoring champions Peter Lee, Bobby Smith and Jim Fox.

The 67's moved on to New Westminster, B.C., to compete for the Memorial Cup, versus the New Westminster Bruins and Sherbrooke Castors. The 1977 Memorial Tournament was the first to be held in British Columbia and the first to use a double round-robin format. Ottawa lost the first game 7–6 to the Bruins, then won three in a row, 6–1 over the Castors, 4–3 in overtime versus the Bruins, and then 5–2 against Sherbrooke. However, Ottawa lost to the host Bruins 6–5 in the championship game.

Ottawa finished first in their division the following season, but lost to the rival Peterborough Petes in the semi-finals. Kilrea and the 67's rebuilt during the 1978–79 season, following that season up with two second-place finishes and then three consecutive division titles from 1982 to 1984.

First Memorial Cup victory
In 1984, the 67's reached the OHL championship series in a rematch from the 1982 OHL finals, against the Kitchener Rangers. Kitchener had been chosen to host the Memorial Cup tournament that year, and the Rangers also made it to the OHL finals. This meant that Ottawa gained an automatic berth in the tournament when they reached the league championship against the Rangers. In the OHL itself, however, Ottawa had unfinished business, having lost to Kitchener two years earlier. The 67's, who finished second overall to Kitchener in the OHL, defeated the Rangers 3–0, with two ties, winning the J. Ross Robertson Cup for the second time in franchise history.

At the Memorial Cup in Kitchener, Ottawa defeated the Laval Voisins, featuring Mario Lemieux, by a score 6–5 in their first game, then beat the Kamloops Jr. Oilers 5–1 in game two, before losing to Kitchener 7–2 to conclude the round-robin. In the semi-final game, Ottawa beat Kamloops again, this time in a 7–2 victory. In the finals versus Kitchener, Ottawa scored a victory in the third consecutive 7–2 game in the tournament, defeating the Rangers and winning their first Memorial Cup. The Most Valuable Player of the Tournament was Adam Creighton. After the season ended, Brian Kilrea left Ottawa to become an assistant coach in the NHL.

Kilrea returns from the NHL
The 67's suffered through two dismal seasons after winning the cup, finishing third-last in the OHL in 1985 and second-last in 1986. Ottawa's saviour would again be Brian Kilrea returning for the 1986–87 season. The second Kilrea era wasn't as superb as his first coaching stint. The 67's finished as high as second place in their division two times, and reached the league's playoff semi-finals three times. The highlight of this era was Andrew Cassels, the rookie of the year in 1986–87, and scoring champion in 1987–88. Kilrea went into retirement after the 1993–94 season. For the 1994–95 season, the 67's were coached by former scoring champion Peter Lee.

The third Kilrea era
Brian Kilrea came out of coaching retirement in 1995 and also became the team's general manager. Kilrea would remain as coach until the end of the 2008–09 season, retaining his duties as general manager until the 2011–12 season.

The Kilrea-coached 67's resurged to the top of the OHL, winning five consecutive east division titles from 1996 to 2000. The 1996–97 season of 104 points is the best in team history, and also the best in the league that year. Ottawa, however, lost in the finals 4–2 to their division rivals, the Oshawa Generals. The 67's reached the finals again in 1998, losing to the Guelph Storm in five games.

Memorial Cup hosts, 1999
In 1999, 67's owner Jeff Hunt led the team's bid to host the 1999 Memorial Cup tournament. Despite the fact that in 1997 the tournament had been hosted across the river in Hull, he was able to convince the Canadian Hockey League to host the event in the city of Ottawa and guarantee his team a berth in the tournament. The 67's did not disappoint, as every game of the series was sold out at the 10,550 seat TD Place Arena.

In the 1998–99 season, the 67's lost to the eventual OHL champion Belleville Bulls in the second round of the playoffs. However, the 67's beat those same Belleville Bulls in the Memorial Cup semi-finals and went on to defeat the Calgary Hitmen of the WHL in the final in a thrilling over-time game that saw Matt Zultek score the winning goal. Nick Boynton was named MVP.

The 67's became the second team to win the Memorial Cup as tournament hosts without winning a league championship. The first team to do so were the Portland Winter Hawks in 1984.

Memorial Cup, 2001
It wasn't long before the 67's went to the Memorial Cup again. Ottawa defeated the Plymouth Whalers in the league championship. The 2001 Memorial Cup was played in Regina, Saskatchewan. Ottawa had tougher luck in this tournament, winning just one game in the round robin versus the hometown Regina Pats, then ultimately losing to Regina 5–0 in the tie-breaker game.

In the 2002–03 season, the 67's reached the OHL finals again, but fell to the eventual Memorial Cup champions Kitchener Rangers in five games. Ottawa also suffered a heart-breaking first round defeat in 2003–04 to the Brampton Battalion.

Memorial Cup, 2005

The 67's finished 6th place in the Eastern Conference in 2004–05, but had a veteran-laden team that managed an impressive playoff run.

Ottawa upset Barrie, Sudbury and Peterborough to reach the finals. The 67's qualified for the 2005 Memorial Cup by virtue of being the league finalists versus the London Knights, who were also hosting the event.

Ottawa won the longest ever game played in the Memorial Cup tournament, when they beat the Kelowna Rockets in double overtime. Ottawa finished third place in the round-robin, then lost to the Rimouski Océanic featuring Sidney Crosby in the semi-finals.

Championships
The Ottawa 67's have appeared in the Memorial Cup tournament five times, winning twice. Ottawa has also won the J. Ross Robertson Cup three times, won the Hamilton Spectator Trophy three times, and have won fourteen division titles, the most in the OHL.

Coaches
Brian Kilrea is a national coaching legend and a coaching presence behind the Ottawa bench for 31 years. Kilrea led the 67's to three OHL Championships and two Memorial Cups. Kilrea briefly moved up to the NHL as an assistant coach with the New York Islanders from 1984 to 1986, and briefly retired for the 1994–95 season. Kilrea, also known as "Killer", has over 1,000 wins coaching junior hockey, all with the Ottawa 67's. He has been named the OHL Coach of the Year five times, and CHL Coach of the Year once in 1996–97. Kilrea was inducted into the Hockey Hall of Fame in 2003.

On September 3, 2008, Kilrea announced that at the end of the 2008–09, he would step down from his head coaching position. He remained with the team as their general manager until the 2011–12 season, after which he was replaced in that post by head coach Chris Byrne.

Andre Tourigny is the most recent 67's coach to earn the OHL Coach of the Year award in 2018–19 leading the 67's to a 50–12–6 record and a franchise record-breaking 106 points. Tourigny won a second consecutive OHL Coach of the Year award in 2019–20 going 50–11–1 in a shortened season and earning the CHL Coach of the Year in the process.

List of coaches with multiple seasons in parentheses.

Players
Denis Potvin and Doug Wilson are the only Ottawa 67's player to be inducted into the Hockey Hall of Fame as players.

Award winners

Retired numbers

NHL alumni
Source

Yearly results

Regular season
Legend: OTL = Overtime loss, SL = Shootout loss

Playoffs
 1967–68 Did not qualify.
 1968–69 Lost to Niagara Falls Flyers 9 points to 5 in quarter-finals.
 1969–70 Lost to Montreal Junior Canadiens 8 points to 2 in quarter-finals.
 1970–71 Defeated Hamilton Red Wings 9 points to 5 in quarter-finals. Lost to Toronto Marlboros 8 points to 0 in semi-finals.
 1971–72 Defeated London Knights 8 points to 6 in quarter-finals.Defeated Oshawa Generals 9 points to 3 in semi-finals.Lost to Peterborough Petes 8 points to 0 in finals.
 1972–73 Defeated Sudbury Wolves 8 points to 0 in quarter-finals.Lost to Toronto Marlboros 8 points to 0 in semi-finals.
 1973–74 Lost to Peterborough Petes 9 points to 5 in quarter-finals.
 1974–75 Lost to Sudbury Wolves 8 points to 6 in first round.
 1975–76 Defeated Kingston Canadians 9 points to 5 in quarter-finals. Lost to Sudbury Wolves 8 points to 2 in semi-finals.
 1976–77 Defeated S.S.Marie Greyhounds 4 games to 0 and 1 tie, in quarter-finals. Defeated Kingston Canadians 4 games to 3 and 1 tie, in semi-finals. Defeated London Knights 4 games to 2 in finals. OHL CHAMPIONS Finished Memorial Cup round-robin tied for first place. Lost to New Westminster Bruins  6–5 in championship game.
 1977–78 Defeated S.S.Marie Greyhounds 9 points to 7 in quarter-finals. Lost to Peterborough Petes 9 points to 7 in semi-finals.
 1978–79 Lost to Kingston Canadians 6 points to 2 in first round.
 1979–80 Defeated Oshawa Generals 4 games to 3 in quarter-finals. Lost to Peterborough Petes 4 games to 0 in semi-finals.
 1980–81 Lost to Kingston Canadians 9 points to 5 in division semi-finals.
 1981–82 Earned first round bye. 1st place in Leyden. Defeated Toronto Marlboros 8 points to 2 in quarter-finals. Defeated Oshawa Generals 8 points to 6 in semi-finals. Lost to Kitchener Rangers 9 points to 1 in finals.
 1982–83 Earned first round bye. 1st place in Leyden. Defeated Cornwall Royals 8 points to 0 in quarter-finals. Lost to Oshawa Generals 8 points to 2 in semi-finals.
 1983–84 Earned first round bye. 1st place in Leyden. Defeated Oshawa Generals 8 points to 0 in quarter-finals. Defeated Toronto Marlboros 8 points to 0 in semi-finals. Defeated Kitchener Rangers 8 points to 2 in finals. OHL CHAMPIONS Finished Memorial Cup round-robin in 2nd place. Defeated Kamloops Junior Oilers 7–2 in semi-final game. Defeated Kitchener Rangers 7–2 in championship game. MEMORIAL CUP CHAMPIONS
 1984–85 Lost to Peterborough Petes 9 points to 1 in first round.
 1985–86 Did not qualify. Awarded First overall selection.
 1986–87 Defeated Cornwall Royals 4 games to 1 in first round. Lost to Peterborough Petes 4 games to 2 in quarter-finals.
 1987–88 Defeated Oshawa Generals 4 games to 3 in first round. Defeated Cornwall Royals 4 games to 1 in quarter-finals. Lost to Peterborough Petes 4 games to 0 in semi-finals.
 1988–89 Defeated Oshawa Generals 4 games to 2 in first round. Lost to Cornwall Royals 4 games to 2 in quarter-finals.
 1989–90 Lost to Peterborough Petes 4 games to 0 in first round.
 1990–91 Defeated Belleville Bulls 4 games to 2 in first round. Defeated North Bay Centennials 4 games to 2 in quarter-finals. Lost to Oshawa Generals 4 games to 1 in semi-finals.
 1991–92 Defeated Cornwall Royals 4 games to 2 in first round. Lost to Peterborough Petes 4 games to 1 in quarter-finals.
 1992–93 Did not qualify.
 1993–94 Defeated Peterborough Petes 4 games to 3 in division quarter-finals. Defeated Sudbury Wolves 4 games to 2 in division semi-finals. Lost to North Bay Centennials 4 games to 1 in semi-finals.
 1994–95 Did not qualify.
 1995–96 Earned bye through division quarter-finals. First place in East. Lost to Belleville Bulls 4 games to 0 in quarter-finals.
 1996–97 Declined first round bye. Defeated Belleville Bulls 4 games to 2 in division quarter-finals. Defeated Barrie Colts 4 games to 1 in quarter-finals. Defeated Guelph Storm 4 games to 3 in semi-finals. Lost to Oshawa Generals 4 games to 2 in finals.
 1997–98 Earned bye through division quarter-finals. 2nd place in OHL. Defeated Owen Sound Platers 4 games to 1 in quarter-finals. Defeated London Knights 4 games to 0 in semi-finals. Lost to Guelph Storm 4 games to 1 in finals.
 1998–99 Defeated North Bay Centennials 4 games to 0 in conference quarter-finals. Lost to Belleville Bulls 4 games to 1 in conference semi-finals. Hosted Memorial Cup tournament in 1999. Finished Memorial Cup round-robin in third place, 1 win & 2 losses. Defeated Belleville Bulls 4–2 in semi-final game. Defeated Calgary Hitmen 7–6 in OT in championship game. MEMORIAL CUP CHAMPIONS
 1999–2000 Defeated Oshawa Generals 4 games to 1 in conference quarter-finals. Lost to Belleville Bulls 4 games to 2 in conference semi-finals.
 2000–01 Defeated North Bay Centennials 4 games to 0 in conference quarter-finals. Defeated Belleville Bulls 4 games to 2 in conference semi-finals. Defeated St. Michael's Majors 4 games to 0 in conference finals. Defeated Plymouth Whalers 4 games to 2 in finals. OHL CHAMPIONS Finished Memorial Cup round-robin tied for 3rd place. Lost to Regina Pats 5–0 in tie-breaker game.
 2001–02 Defeated Peterborough Petes 4 games to 2 in conference quarter-finals. Lost to St. Michael's Majors 4 games to 3 in conference semi-finals.
 2002–03 Defeated Mississauga IceDogs 4 games to 1 in conference quarter-finals. Defeated Oshawa Generals 4 games to 2 in conference semi-finals. Defeated St. Michael's Majors 4 games to 3 in conference finals. Lost to Kitchener Rangers 4 games to 1 in finals.
 2003–04 Lost to Brampton Battalion 4 games to 3 in conference quarter-finals.
 2004–05 Defeated Barrie Colts 4 games to 2 in conference quarter-finals. Defeated Sudbury Wolves 4 games to 2 in conference semi-finals. Defeated Peterborough Petes 4 games to 0 in conference finals. Lost to London Knights 4 games to 1 in finals. Finished Memorial Cup round-robin in third place, 1 win & 2 losses. Lost to Rimouski Océanic 7–4 in semi-final game.
 2005–06 Lost to Peterborough Petes 4 games to 2 in conference quarter-finals.
 2006–07 Lost to Belleville Bulls 4 games to 1 in conference quarter-finals.
 2007–08 Lost to Oshawa Generals 4 games to 0 in conference quarter-finals.
 2008–09 Lost to Niagara IceDogs 4 games to 3 in conference quarter-finals.
 2009-10 Defeated Niagara IceDogs 4 games to 1 in conference quarter-finals. Lost to Mississauga St.Michaels Majors 4 games to 3 in conference semi-finals.
 2010–11 Lost to Sudbury Wolves 4 games to 0 in conference quarter-finals.
 2011–12 Defeated Belleville Bulls 4 games to 2 in conference quarter-finals. Defeated Barrie Colts 4 games to 3 in conference semi-finals. Lost to Niagara IceDogs 4 games to 1 in conference finals.
 2012–13 Did not qualify.
 2013–14 Did not qualify.
 2014–15 Lost to Niagara IceDogs 4 games to 2 in conference quarter-finals.
 2015–16 Lost to Niagara IceDogs 4 games to 1 in conference quarter-finals.
 2016–17 Lost to Mississauga Steelheads 4 games to 2 in conference quarter-finals.
 2017–18 Lost to Hamilton Bulldogs 4 games to 1 in conference quarter-finals.
 2018–19 Defeated Hamilton Bulldogs 4 games to 0 in conference quarter-finals. Defeated Sudbury Wolves 4 games to 0 in conference semi-finals. Defeated Oshawa Generals 4 games to 0 in conference finals. Lost to Guelph Storm 4 games to 2 in finals.
 2019–20 Cancelled.
 2020–21 Cancelled.
 2021–22 Lost to North Bay Battalion 4 games to 0 in conference quarter-finals.

Uniforms and logos
 The 67's colours and original uniforms are based on those of the Ottawa Senators from the 1920s and 1930s. The team colours are red, white & black. The original 67's uniforms are barber-pole style jerseys with the square 67's logo. The 67's have also used a white background jersey with barber pole stripes on the shoulders and sleeves.

The 67's third jersey was unveiled in 2001. It features a logo with an angry puck, and a white background body with red and black jagged trim along the bottom and arms. It also has an opposite black background style with white & red trim.

Mascots: Riley Raccoon, The Killer Puck

Arenas
The Ottawa 67's played the first half of their 1967–68 inaugural season at the Robert Guertin Arena in Hull, Quebec, until completion of the new arena at Lansdowne Park.

The Ottawa 67's have played at TD Place Arena since January 1968 when it was known as the Ottawa Civic Centre. The Arena has the largest capacity of all current OHL arenas.

The design of TD Place Arena is unique in that it is built into the side of a football stadium, and includes a large conference hall under its north stands. The seating in TD Place Arena is almost all on the north side and ends of the arena, with very few seats on the south side towards the football stadium.

TD Place Arena has played host to many OHL and CHL events including:
The Memorial Cup in 1972 and 1999.
The Chrysler Challenge Cup in 1986 and 1987.
The Hershey Cup in 2002.

The Ottawa 67's also play the occasional home game at the Canadian Tire Centre. Twice the 67's played host to an interleague game versus the Gatineau Olympiques of the QMJHL. On December 30, 2004, the arena hosted the largest crowd ever witnessed in the Ontario Hockey League as 20,081 people saw the Ottawa 67's defeated by the Kingston Frontenacs. This came as a result of the arena seating capacity being expanded by 2,000 seats.

In early February 2012, it was announced that the 67's would move to the Canadian Tire Centre for two seasons while renovations were finished at TD Place Arena. This came as a result of delays in construction originally planned to allow the 67's to stay at TD Place through the rebuild but now a closed site is needed to meet deadlines for NASL and CFL expansion.

See also
 Ice hockey in Ottawa
List of ice hockey teams in Ontario

References

External links
Official website

Ontario Hockey League teams
67
Ice hockey clubs established in 1967
Ice hockey teams in Ontario